Ramón Vinay (August 31, 1911 – January 4, 1996) was a famous Chilean operatic tenor with a powerful, dramatic voice. He is probably best remembered for his appearances in the title role of Giuseppe Verdi's tragic opera Otello.

Biography
He started his operatic career as a baritone in Mexico in 1938. He later switched to tenor, making a second debut in 1943 and forging a successful international career after World War II. Vinay eventually returned to the baritone fold in 1962 and retired from the stage in 1969.

Even as a tenor, however, his vocal timbre retained its dark, baritonal colouration.

He was the son of Jean Vinay Robert and Rosa Sepúlveda. Born in Chillán, Chile, Vinay earned particular renown throughout the operatic world for his interpretation of the role of Otello. For a time, he made the part his own. Perhaps his most significant appearance as Otello occurred in 1947, in a radio broadcast of the opera under the baton of Arturo Toscanini. His colleagues on this occasion were Herva Nelli, Giuseppe Valdengo and Nan Merriman, together with the NBC Symphony Orchestra and Chorus. This performance was subsequently issued by RCA Victor on both LP and CD. In recent years, it has appeared on CDs issued by other companies, notably on the Guild label. Many critics consider it the best complete Otello ever recorded.

A fine actor, Vinay was also the first tenor to sing the role of Otello on television. That was in 1948, in the initial telecast of an entire opera from the Met. He also sang Otello at La Scala, in Salzburg and at the Royal Opera House, Covent Garden. In all, he performed it hundreds of times. He is said to be one of the two opera singers to have sung both Otello and Iago (the baritone villain) in Verdi's tragic masterpiece during the course of a career (the other being Carlos Guichandut).

Vinay's overall tenor repertoire was comparatively ample. It also embraced heavy Wagnerian roles (he sang at the Bayreuth Festival in 1952–57), as well as Canio in Leoncavallo's Pagliacci, Don José in Bizet's Carmen and Samson in Saint-Saëns's Samson et Dalila. Apart from Iago, the baritone parts which he performed included Telramund, Bartolo, Falstaff and Scarpia. In 1971, he also briefly returned from retirement to perform as the Grand Inquisitor in Verdi's Don Carlo, a role originally written for the bass voice.

He was a National Patron of Delta Omicron, an international professional music fraternity.

He died in Mexico, aged 84.

Vinay was married to Oklahoma-born soprano Tessie Mobley.

Selected recordings

Bizet – Carmen (Stokowski/Heidt, Pease, M. Koshetz) – Eklipse
Leoncavallo – Pagliacci (Antonicelli/Quarteraro, Warren, Thompson) – Guild
Saint-Saëns – Samson et Dalila (Cellini/Stevens) – VAI
Verdi – Otello (Toscanini/Nelli, Valdengo) – RCA
Verdi – Otello (Busch/Albanese, Warren) – Preiser Arkadia
Verdi – Otello (Furtwängler/Martinis, Schöffler) – EMI
Verdi – Otello (Cleva 1950/1951/excerpts/Steber, Guarrera) – Preiser
Verdi – Otello (Beecham 1958/Stella, Taddei, Modesti) – Idis
Wagner – Lohengrin (Sawallisch/Thomas, Silja, Varnay, Crass) – Philips
Wagner – Parsifal (Krauss/Mödl, London, Weber, Uhde, Greindl) – Arlecchino
Wagner – Parsifal (Knappertsbusch/Mödl, Fischer-Dieskau, Greindl) – Myto
Wagner – Der Ring des Nibelungen (Keilberth/Mödl, Resnik, Hotter, Windgassen, Uhde, Weber) – Melodram
Wagner – Der Ring des Nibelungen (Krauss/Varnay, Hotter, Resnik, Greindl, Malaniuk) – Gala
Wagner – Tannhäuser (Keilberth/Brouwenstijn, Fischer-Dieskau, Greindl)- Melodram
Wagner – Tristan und Isolde (Jochum/Varnay, Neidlinger, Weber, Malaniuk) – Melodram
Wagner – Tristan und Isolde (Karajan/Mödl, Weber, Hotter, Malaniuk) – Myto
Recital live (Arias by Verdi, Leoncavallo, Saint-Saëns, Wagner, duets with Ljuba Welitsch) – Melodram
Four Famous Met-Tenors of the Past (Peerce, Björling, Tucker) – Preiser – LV
Met – 100 Singers – RCA

Audio examples 
  Richard Wagner, Walküre 2. Aufzug: "Weh! Weh! Suessestes Weib!"
Dirigent: Clemens Krauss; Festspielhaus Bayreuth, 1953
  Richard Wagner, Lohengrin 2. Aufzug: "Erhebe dich, Genossin meiner Schmach!" (as Telramund)
Dirigent: Wolfgang Sawallisch; Festspielhaus Bayreuth, 1962
  Richard Wagner, Lohengrin 2. Aufzug: "Du wilde Seherin" (as Telramund)
Dirigent: Wolfgang Sawallisch; Festspielhaus Bayreuth, 1962

References

External links
Ramon Vinay, 1911–1996
Discography (Capon's Lists of Opera Recordings)

To the list of the selected recordings, could be added the Die Walkure production of   1957, with the Orchester der Bayreuth Festspiele conducted by Hans Knappertsbusch. Ramon Vinay sings Siegmund  with Birgit Nillson as Sieglinde. This latter became known as the "Legendary 1957 Bayreuth Production".

1911 births
1996 deaths
Heldentenors
Chilean opera singers
20th-century Chilean male singers
Chilean people of French descent
Operatic tenors
People from Chillán
20th-century male opera singers
20th-century Chilean male artists